The Punta Gorda Residential District is a U.S. historic district (designated as such on January 7, 1991) located in Punta Gorda, Florida. The district is bounded by West Retta Esplanade, Berry Street, West Virginia Avenue and Taylor Street.

History
Twenty-two city blocks are included in the National Register District, which extends west from the city's commercial core and contains 125 mostly residential structures. The noteworthy era for the district was 1884 to 1930 with both wood-frame vernacular buildings and American Queen Anne style architecture, built during the mid-1880s through the late 1910s. Several structures are examples of the Florida land boom of the 1920s.

Hurricane Charley
Hurricane Charley wreaked havoc on houses that had survived storms for a century. The area has since been rebuilt.

References

External links
 Charlotte County listings at National Register of Historic Places

Punta Gorda, Florida
National Register of Historic Places in Charlotte County, Florida
Historic districts on the National Register of Historic Places in Florida
Geography of Charlotte County, Florida